Spengler Bridge, named after Henry Cones Spengler (26 Feb 1847 - 25 Aug 1911), Chatham County Highway Commissioner, is a historic Pratt Truss bridge located at Chatham in Columbia County, New York.  It was built in 1880 by the Morse Bridge Company of Youngstown, Ohio.  It is composed of two Pratt trusses with counters, each 138 feet in length.  It measures 16 feet wide and crosses the Kinderhook Creek.

It was added to the National Register of Historic Places in 1973.

References

Road bridges on the National Register of Historic Places in New York (state)
Bridges completed in 1896
Transportation buildings and structures in Columbia County, New York
National Register of Historic Places in Columbia County, New York
Pratt truss bridges in the United States
1896 establishments in New York (state)